Victor H. Kohring (August 2, 1958 – September 6, 2022) was an American politician who was a member of the Alaska House of Representatives. A Republican, he was elected to seven consecutive two-year terms beginning in 1994. Kohring represented Wasilla in District 26 and then District 14, after redistricting due to the 2000 United States census. He resigned on July 19, 2007, during a widespread Alaska political corruption probe.

Corruption
Kohring was indicted on federal bribery and extortion charges on May 4, 2007. He, along with former state legislators, Republicans Pete Kott and Bruce Weyhrauch, were accused of soliciting and accepting bribes from VECO Corporation, an oil field services company. Their capital and district offices had been among 20 searched by FBI agents on August 31, 2006. Kohring resigned his seat on June 20, 2007.

On November 1, 2007, a federal jury found Kohring guilty in three out of four criminal charges and acquitted on the fourth, a charge of extortion. In May 2008, he was sentenced to three and a half years in prison.  Kohring asked outgoing President George W. Bush for a pardon that was not granted.

The conviction was vacated, and in 2011, Kohring agreed to plead guilty in exchange for being sentenced to time served and conditions on his release. Kohring was released on June 11, 2009.

Recent history
Kohring ran for a seat on the Wasilla City Council. He was defeated by a 2–to-1 margin on October 1, 2013.

In 2014 Kohring was the Alaskan Independence Party candidate for the United States Senate from Alaska. He withdrew from the race in September 2014 and endorsed Republican challenger Dan Sullivan.

On September 6, 2022, driving alone, Kohring crossed the center line of the Glenn Highway near Palmer and was killed when he collided head-on with a semi-trailer truck.

References

External links
 Vic Kohring at 100 Years of Alaska's Legislature

|-

1958 births
2022 deaths
Road incident deaths in Alaska
Alaskan Independence Party politicians
Republican Party members of the Alaska House of Representatives
Politicians from Anchorage, Alaska
People from Wasilla, Alaska
People from Waukegan, Illinois
Alaska Pacific University alumni
Politicians convicted of extortion under color of official right
Politicians convicted of program bribery
Alaska politicians convicted of crimes
21st-century American politicians